Talking Cock may refer to:
Talking Cock (comedy show), a stand-up comedy show by Richard Herring
TalkingCock.com, a Singaporean satirical and humour website
Talking Cock the Movie, a Singaporean film